Policybazaar is an Indian insurance aggregator and multinational financial technology company based in Gurgaon. The company was founded in June 2008 by Yashish Dahiya, Alok Bansal and Avaneesh Nirjar. It provides a digital platform - website and app - where users can compare insurance policies and other financial services from major insurance companies. The company is India's largest insurance aggregator, and has expanded its operations to the United Arab Emirates.

Policybazaar is the flagship subsidiary of PB Fintech Ltd which also owns the credit product aggregator Paisabazaar.

History 
Policybazaar.com was founded in June 2008 by Yashish Dahiya, Alok Bansal and Avaneesh Nirjar, starting out as an insurance comparison website. At that time, the Indian insurance industry still lacked transparency and policies were mostly sold through agents. Policybazaar started by listing the details of multiple insurance policies for customers to choose from. It began as a price-comparison website, and an information portal for learning about insurance and insurance programs. The website subsequently expanded to becoming a marketplace for insurance policies. In 2015, Policybazaar launched its app for Android and iOS users.

In February 2020, Sarbvir Singh was appointed CEO effective December 2019 while Yashish Dahiya took over the role of group CEO.

In June 2021, Policybazaar obtained the insurance broking license from IRADA and announced that it would set up 100 offline outlets across India. The company also surrendered its web aggregator license.

Product

Policybazaar moved from a policy price comparison website to an insurance selling operation. The company claims to process nearly 25% of India's life insurance and over 7% of the country's retail health cover. Policybazaar provides several types of insurance plans like life insurance, health insurance, motor insurance, travel insurance as well as group plans.

Policybazaar.com has tie-ups with insurance companies that help it procure information such as price, benefit, insurance cover, etc. directly from the insurers. Users can use the Policybazaar website or app to research, compare and buy insurance policies from over 40 insurance providers. Policybazaar has companies, who offer car insurance, health insurance, life insurance, corporate insurance and travel insurance, as its business partners.

Insurance Regulatory And Development Authority of India regulates the insurance web aggregation business of Policybazaar. The company is registered as an insurance web aggregator under the Insurance Web Aggregator Regulations, 2017.

Funding 
Policybazaar.com has so far raised US$366 million in 7 rounds of funding since its inception in 2008.

Info Edge, which runs the online job portal Naukri.com, invested  as the seed fund in Policybazaar in mid 2008. Intel Capital and Info Edge invested  into Policybazaar in May 2011 as part of the venture round.

Policybazaar raised US$9 million from Intel Capital and Inventus Capital Partners in its series A investment round. Policybazaar raised US$5 million in its third round of funding in April 2013. This Series B investment was led by Inventus Capital Partners along with Info Edge and Intel Capital. In May 2014, Policybazaar.com raised $20 million in a Series C round of funding from existing investors including Tiger Global Management.

Policybazaar raised around $40 million in its Series D round of funding in April 2015 from Premji Invest, the personal investment vehicle of Wipro chairman Azim Premji. The Series D also attracted money from Steadview Capital and ABG Capital. Policybazaar raised US$77 million in its Series E funding round. This was led by at least three new investors including True North and IDG Venture Partners invested in this round. Also, several media reports claimed that Boston-based asset management firm Wellington Management Group invested the online insurance aggregator.

Policybazaar raised a total of US$238 million in June 2018 in its series F funding. Tokyo-based Softbank Group’s Vision fund led the round with its US$150 million investment that gave it a 15% stake in the parent company of Policybazaar - ETechAces Marketing and Consulting. The Series F investment saw Info Edge put in $45 million in the company through a special purpose vehicle, effectively lifting its stake to 13% from 9%. Softbank invested an additional $130 million to increase its stake to 15% in July 2020, valuing Policybazaar at around U$1.5 billion.

In November 2021, PB Fintech Ltd, the parent company of Policybazaar, opened its initial public offering (IPO) and raised . Shares of PB Fintech Ltd began trading on National Stock Exchange and Bombay Stock Exchange on 15 November 2021.

Investors 
 SoftBank Group (15.76%)
 Info Edge (India) Limited (14.56%)
 SVF Python II (Cayman) (9.5%)
 Tencent (9.16%)
 Claymore Investment (6.26%)
 Tiger Global Management
 Falcon Edge
 Alpha Wave
 Chiratae Ventures
 Inventus Capital Partners
 Premji Invest 
 Ribbit Capital
 Steadview Capital Management
 Temasek Holdings
 True North traces
Wellington Management Company

Awards 
 IAMAI Indian Digital Awards for best financial website 2015
 Award for Best Mobile App Consumer Finance in 2015 by GSF Mobile Appies
 Exchange4media Golden Mikes Award 2015
 CMO Asia Awards 2015
 BAM Award 2015
 Excellence in Operations - Iconic IDC Insight Award 2015
 Emerging Star Award - BML Munjal Award 2017
 Insurance Innovation Award 2018 - The Digital Insurer Global Livefest Award
 Best Insurance Tech - IAMAI India Digital Awards 2018
 Best Marketing & PR Campaigns - India PR & Communications Awards 2018
 Best Content in Online PR Campaign - Drivers of Digital - Inkspell Awards 2018
 Best Consumer Awareness Campaign - Silver -Economic Times Brand Equity Kaleido Award 2019
 Best bank in Fintech - Financial Express Best Bank 2019
 Leading Fintech Innovator in India - KPMG-H2 Ventures Report

Controversies
In early 2019, Policybazaar filed an intellectual property case against insurance company Acko General Insurance and Coverfox Insurance Broking Private Limited for trademark infringement.

References

External links
Official website
PolicyBazaar UAE

Indian companies established in 2008
Financial services companies established in 2008
Online financial services companies of India
Insurance companies of India
Companies based in Gurgaon
2008 establishments in Haryana
2021 initial public offerings
Companies listed on the National Stock Exchange of India
Companies listed on the Bombay Stock Exchange